The 29th and final Stinkers Bad Movie Awards were released by the Hastings Bad Cinema Society in 2007 to honor the worst films the film industry had to offer in 2006. Zoom received the most nominations with ten. Dishonourable mentions are also featured for Worst Picture (39 total). A few months after the results were released, the Stinkers released their expanded 1981 ballot before shutting down for good.

Winners and nominees

Worst Picture

Dishonourable Mentions

 American Dreamz (Universal)
 An American Haunting (Freestyle)
 Babel (Paramount)
 Barnyard (Paramount, Nickelodeon)
 The Benchwarmers (Sony)
 Big Momma's House 2 (FOX)
 The Black Dahlia (Universal)
 Borat (FOX)
 The Break-Up (Universal)
 Click (Sony)
 The Da Vinci Code (Sony)
 Date Movie (FOX)
 Doogal (TWC)
 The Fountain (Warner Bros.)
 Freedomland (Sony)
 Garfield: A Tail of Two Kitties (FOX)
 Grandma's Boy (FOX)
 The Hills Have Eyes (FOX)
 Hoot (New Line)
 Idiocracy (FOX)
 Inland Empire (518)
 Just My Luck (FOX)
 Larry the Cable Guy: Health Inspector (Lionsgate)
 London (Sony)
 Madea's Family Reunion (Lionsgate)
 Marie Antoinette (Sony)
 Material Girls (MGM)
 Nacho Libre (Paramount)
 National Lampoon's Pledge This! (Pop Films)
 The Pink Panther (Sony/MGM)
 Poseidon (Warner Bros.)
 RV (Sony)
 Rocky Balboa (Sony/MGM)
 The Santa Clause 3: The Escape Clause (Disney)
 A Scanner Darkly (Warner Bros.)
 Scary Movie 4 (Dimension)
 The Shaggy Dog (Disney)
 Silent Hill (Sony)
 Stick It (Touchstone)
 The Tiger and the Snow (Strand)
 Ultraviolet (Sony)
 Wassup Rockers (First Look)
 The Wild (Disney)

Other Categories

Films with multiple wins and nominations

The following films received multiple nominations:

The following films received multiple wins:

References 

Stinkers Bad Movie Awards
Stinkers Bad Movie Awards